The 2020 FIA World Rally Championship-2 was the eighth season of the World Rally Championship-2, an auto racing championship for rally cars that was recognised by the Fédération Internationale de l'Automobile as the second-highest tier of international rallying. The category was open to cars entered by manufacturers and complying with R5 regulations.

Kalle Rovanperä and Jonne Halttunen were the reigning drivers' and co-drivers' champions, but they did not defend their titles as they are contesting the World Rally Championship with Toyota.

At the conclusion of the championship, Mads Østberg and Torstein Eriksen won the Drivers' and Co-Drivers' championships, while Toksport WRT won the teams' title.

Calendar

Entries
The following teams and crews that entered in the 2020 World Rally Championship-2:

Summary
Citroën's factory team entered selected rounds of the 2019 championship, but will not compete in 2020 after the company withdrew from rallying. The Citroën C3 R5 will remain available to independent teams. PH Sport will run one C3 R5 for Mads Østberg and Torstein Eriksen.

M-Sport Ford WRT committed two cars to the championship for crews led by Adrien Fourmaux and Rhys Yates. Gus Greensmith and co-driver Elliott Edmondson, who drove for the team in 2019, will not contest the championship as the joined the sport's premier class.

Hyundai Motorsport entered the championship under the name Hyundai Motorsport N. The team entered two Hyundai i20 R5s, one for Nikolay Gryazin and Yaroslav Fedorov, and the other for Ole Christian Veiby and Jonas Andersson.

Toksport WRT became the first independent team to join the championship. The team entered a Škoda Fabia R5 Evo for 2017 World Rally Championship-2 drivers' champion Pontus Tidemand, who returned to the championship.

Škoda announced that they would not enter a works team, arguing that Škoda Motorsport had proven themselves as a team and that the company would instead turn to supporting independent teams and drivers in 2020. Similarly, Volkswagen will not enter a works team. The company cancelled all of its petrol-powered motorsports programmes to focus on electric racing, but will allow development of the Volkswagen Polo GTI R5 to continue.

Changes
In 2019, the championship was run as the World Rally Championship-2 Pro, a class within the World Rally Championship-2 for professional crews entered by manufacturer teams. However, the multi-class structure was found to be too confusing, and so the category was re-structured for the 2020 season. Professional crews contested the World Rally Championship-2 and privateers will contest the World Rally Championship-3.

Results and standings

Season summary

Scoring system
Points are awarded to the top ten classified finishers in each event. Unlike the World Rally Championship, extra points are not awarded for the Power Stage.

FIA World Rally Championship-2 for Drivers
(Results key)

FIA World Rally Championship-2 for Co-Drivers
(Results key)

FIA World Rally Championship-2 for Teams
(Results key)

Notes

References

External links
 
 FIA World Rally Championship-2 2020 at ewrc-results.com

 
World Rally Championship-2
World Rally Championship-2